Professor 'Abdulfattah bin Suleiman Al Mashat is  the Rector of the newly established Jeddah University, Saudi Arabia since June 23, 2016. He was previously at King Abdulaziz University, holding   the positions  of Dean of Admission and Registration, director of the Center for Information Technology from 2004–2006,    Dean of the Faculty of Computing and Information Technology from 2012 to 2016, both at King Abdulaziz University. ad then    Vice Rector for Development (2013- 2016).

Early life
Al Mashat was born in   Mecca in 1386 AH and descended from the well respected family of Bany Mashat Almonayfiyyen, which produced a number of Islamic clergymen like Shaikh Abdul Qadir Bin Ali Mashat Al-Munafy.

References

External links 
 Ubio at University of Jeddah
 Google Scholar
 dblp
 ResearchGate

1967 births
Living people
People from Mecca